Northeast Airlines Flight 258 was a scheduled domestic passenger flight from New York's La Guardia Airport that crashed while trying to land at Nantucket Memorial Airport, Massachusetts, at 11:34 on the night of August 15, 1958. All three crew-members and 20 of the 31 passengers were killed, among them Gordon Dean, former chairman of the United States Atomic Energy Commission.

The accident aircraft, a Convair 240 operated by Northeast Airlines, commenced a non-precision VOR approach to the uncontrolled airport despite the fact that visibility, at one-eighth of a mile in fog, was below the legal minimum required for such an approach. The aircraft flew into the ground a third of a mile short of the Runway 24 threshold and some 600 feet to the right of the extended centre-line. A post-crash fire ensued; most survivors as well as many of the dead were ejected from the wreckage.

A Civil Aeronautics Board investigation found that the captain of the aircraft failed to acknowledge transmissions warning him of the deteriorating weather conditions in the minutes before the crash. The CAB also criticised Northeast's training and operational procedures, noting deficiencies in aircrew proficiency, recordkeeping and monitoring of company radio frequencies.

References

External links 
The Patient in Room 601 - Documentary on crash of Flight 258 in Nantucket in 1958 focusing on Lita Levine, a survivor of the crash from New York City

Airliner accidents and incidents in Massachusetts
Aviation accidents and incidents in the United States in 1958
Northeast Airlines accidents and incidents
1958 in Massachusetts
History of Nantucket, Massachusetts
August 1958 events in the United States
Airliner accidents and incidents caused by pilot error
Accidents and incidents involving the Convair CV-240 family